Dhamni (Surya) Dam, is an earthfill dam on Surya River near Dhamni, Palghar district in the state of Maharashtra in India.

Specifications

Purpose
 Irrigation 
 Hydroelectricity
Surya Hydroelectric Project was commissioned in 1999 by Government of Maharashtra and then Handed over to MAHAGENCO (then MSEB) in May 2002.
The plant's capacity is 6 MW, generated by one Vertical shaft Kaplan turbine, manufactured by BHEL.

See also
 Dams in Maharashtra
 List of reservoirs and dams in India

References

Dams in Thane district
Dams completed in 1990
1990 establishments in Maharashtra
20th-century architecture in India